Chak 36 NB is a village located on the Sargodha Bypass in Sargodha District, Punjab, Pakistan. The largest caste is Baloch. It is located approximately 5.5 km from Sargodha city.

Schools 
Following schools are located in Chak 36 NB:
Government Boys Middle School
Government Girls High School
Mohammedan Scholars Academy

Notable landmarks 
 Jamia Masjid Farooq-e-Azam
 Imam Bargah Qasr-e-Zahrah
 Jamia Masjid Muhammadia
 Masjid Hanfia
 Masjid Ayesha Siddiqa

References

Populated places in Sargodha District